Pseudopostega monstruosa is a moth of the family Opostegidae. It is only known from Amazonian premontane rainforest in east-central Ecuador.

The length of the forewings is about 3 mm. Adults are mostly white. Adults have been collected in January.

Etymology
The species name is derived from the Latin monstruosa (weird, unusual, prodigious, frightening) in reference to the unusually large pedicel and large, wrinkled gnathos in the male genitalia.

External links
A Revision of the New World Plant-Mining Moths of the Family Opostegidae (Lepidoptera: Nepticuloidea)

Opostegidae
Moths described in 2007